Kusaha is a small village in Jagdishpur block of Bhojpur district in Bihar, India. As of 2011, its population was 692, in 130 households. It is located southwest of the city of Jagdishpur.

References 

Villages in Bhojpur district, India